Cyprus–France relations are foreign relations between Cyprus and France. The two countries share membership of the European Union, Council of Europe and Organization for Security and Co-operation in Europe. Cyprus is an associate member of the Francophonie organization since 2006. France is a supporter of Cyprus against Turkey's refusal to recognize and admit Cypriot ships and planes.

Resident diplomatic missions

 Cyprus has an embassy in Paris.
 France has an embassy in Nicosia.

See also 
Foreign relations of Cyprus
Foreign relations of France

External links 
 French Foreign Ministry about relations with Cyprus
List of Treaties between the 2 countries by the Ministry of Foreign Affaires of Cyprus
French embassy in Cyprus

References

 Ministry for Europe and Foreign Affairs, 2020. Cyprus. [online] France Diplomacy - Ministry for Europe and Foreign Affairs. Available at: <https://www.diplomatie.gouv.fr/en/country-files/cyprus/> [Accessed 27 October 2020].
 Financial Mirror, 2020. French Naval Presence In Cyprus Takes A Clear Stance. [online] Financial Mirror. Available at: <https://www.financialmirror.com/2020/02/22/french-naval-presence-in-cyprus-takes-a-clear-stance/> [Accessed 27 October 2020].

 

 
France
Bilateral relations of France